Mutapčić (Cyrillic Мутапчић) is a Bosnian family name. Notable people with the surname include the following:

 Abdulah Mutapčić (born 1932), Bosnian politician 
 Elvis Mutapčić (born 1986), Bosnian-American mixed martial artist 
 Emir Mutapčić (born 1960), Bosnian basketball player and coach
 Kenan Mutapčić (b. 1979) Bosnian rugby union football player in France

Bosnian surnames